Point Loma Nazarene University (PLNU) is a private Christian liberal arts college with its main campus on the Point Loma oceanfront in San Diego, California, United States. It was founded in 1902 as a Bible college by the Church of the Nazarene.

History

The college was founded by several female laypersons in the Church of the Nazarene with the assistance of Phineas F. Bresee, co-founder of the Nazarene Church in Los Angeles. The "initiators," in the words of historian Timothy L. Smith, convinced "a reluctant Bresee to support the venture."

The institution envisioned was "a simple Bible college" to train ministerial and lay leadership for the newly established Nazarene denomination; however, a Bible college did not fit Bresee's notion of a real Christian school, and he "promised little or no assistance." The women went ahead with their plan, with money raised from their husbands, and Pacific Bible College opened in 1902 under Principal Mary Hill. In 1906, Bresee's interest in the college was piqued with a large donation from Mr. and Mrs. Jackson Deets. Bresee now saw the possibility for a real liberal arts college in the newly renamed Deets Pacific Bible College. Bresee and Deets were soon planning Nazarene University together: academy, liberal arts college, and bible school. It became one of the first three "official" educational institutions affiliated with the Church of the Nazarene in 1908, and was named Deets Pacific Bible College in 1909. In 1910, it was renamed Nazarene University and, against the wishes of Jackson Deets and the advice of Nazarene General Superintendent John W. Goodwin, the college moved to the Hugus Ranch property in Pasadena, California. It was renamed again to Pasadena University following a theological dispute and near bankruptcy in 1917.

In 1924, the name was changed again, this time to Pasadena College. The school received accreditation from the Western Association of Schools and Colleges in 1949. The college preparatory program was ended in the 1950s. In 1973, the college was relocated to the former California Western University campus on Point Loma in San Diego, after a rejected plan to move the school to Santa Ana. The Pasadena campus was later purchased by the U.S. Center for World Mission and currently houses William Carey International University. After the move to San Diego, the college existed for ten years as "Point Loma College: An Institution of the Church of the Nazarene" until the name was changed to Point Loma Nazarene College (PLNC) in 1983. In 1998, the name was changed again, to Point Loma Nazarene University (PLNU).

Presidents

Campus

PLNU has different locations besides the main campus in Point Loma, with graduate programs at regional centers in Bakersfield, and Mission Valley San Diego. Once owned by the Theosophical Society, the Point Loma site has a lengthy pre-PLNU history.

Lomaland
Before it served as the Point Loma Nazarene University campus, the area was the location of a Theosophical commune run by Katherine Tingley. It became known as "Lomaland". By 1900, the campus was dominated by the imposing Academy Building and the adjoining Temple of Peace of the Theosophical Society. Both buildings were constructed in the Theosophical vernacular that included the flattened arch motif and whimsical references to antiquity. The buildings were topped by amethyst domes, which were lighted at night and could be seen offshore. The entrance to the Academy Building was dominated by two massive carved doors that symbolized the Theosophical Principles of "spiritual enlightenment" and "human potential." The sculptor, Reginald Machell, was educated in England, but moved to Lomaland in 1896. The interior furnishings he carved for the Academy Building were influenced by the Symbolist style popular in Europe at that time. Machell also supervised the woodworking school at Point Loma.

Lomaland had public buildings for the entire community and several private homes. The home of Albert Spalding, the sporting goods tycoon, was built in 1901. The building combines late-Victorian wooden architecture with historical motifs such as the modified Corinthian column (now shaped like a papyrus leaf) and flattened arches. The amethyst dome was restored by a team of scholars led by Dr. Dwayne Little of the PLNC department of History and Political Science in 1983. The first Greek theater in North America was built on this site in 1901. It was used for sporting events and theatrical performances. The tessellated pavement and stoa were added in 1909. The theatre was the site of a number of productions of Greek and Shakespearean dramas. Cabrillo Hall, which served as the International Center Headquarters, the Brotherhood Headquarters, and "Wachere Crest" building, was completed in 1909. It served as office space for the Theosophical Society and as a residence for Katherine Tingley after 1909. It was originally located on the west side of Pepper Tree lane. The hall is currently the location for the Communication Studies Department.

Lomaland dissolved in the aftermath of World War I and was used for bootlegging during the Prohibition period.  The tunnel systems and site were later taken over by Fort Rosecrans before World War II. It served as an observation point and several barracks were installed on the site, which constitute some of the campus dormitories for PLNU. In 1952, California Western University relocated to Point Loma. In 1968, California Western changed its name to United States International University and moved to Scripps Ranch, while the California Western School of Law retained its old name and relocated from its Point Loma location to downtown in 1973. Pasadena College moved from Pasadena to Point Loma to replace it.

Religious affiliation
PLNU is one of the eight U.S. liberal arts colleges and universities affiliated with the Church of the Nazarene. Although its name might suggest that it is the college for the "Point Loma" region, no such region currently exists; PLNU is the college for the "Southwest Region" of the United States, comprising the northern California, Sacramento, central California, Los Angeles, Anaheim, southern California, Arizona, New Mexico, and Hawaii districts, which include California, Arizona, New Mexico, Hawaii, and parts of Nevada, Utah, and Texas. Each college receives financial backing from the Nazarene churches on its region; part of each church budget is paid into a fund for its regional school. Each college or university is also bound by a gentlemen's agreement not to actively recruit outside its respective "educational region."

Point Loma Nazarene University offers many ministry opportunities including chapel, community and discipleship ministries, international and worship ministries. Attendance to chapel is based on the number of units the student is enrolled. Full-time students are required to attend chapel. Freshmen and sophomores must attend 33 chapels, and juniors and seniors must attend 25 chapels. Students can be fined for being absent from chapel too many times.

Academics
Point Loma Nazarene University has a "commitment to educating students as whole people." The university offers more than 60 areas of scholarship as Bachelor of Arts and Bachelor of Science degrees, as well as graduate degrees. There were 3,480 students at the college in 2007, 2,346 of whom were undergraduates.  The 2007 acceptance rate for students who applied to the college was 53.5 percent.

In 2017, PLNU launched its first doctoral-level curriculum in the form of a Doctor of Nursing Practice program.

Accreditations
The university is accredited by the WASC Senior College and University Commission. Some programs and units at the university are accredited by specific organizations: 

Commission on Collegiate Nursing Education (School of Nursing, B.S., M.S., and D.N.P.)
California Board of Registered Nursing
Academy of Nutrition and Dietetics
Accreditation Council for Business Schools and Programs (Fermanian School of Business)
California Commission on Teacher Credentialing
Commission on Accreditation of Athletic Training Education
Academy of Nutrition and Dietetics
Council on Social Work Education
National Association of Schools of Music

Rankings 

U.S. News & World Report 2019 ranked PLNU #9 in the Regional Universities West category out of 128 schools listed in that section. Forbes ranked PLNU as #263 in the country among all universities as of 2019 and #54 in the West.

The average high school GPA for admitted freshmen in 2018 (unweighted) was 3.79, while the average SAT was 1,690/2,400. According to PayScale, the median mid-career salary of PLNU graduates in 2019 (bachelor's degrees only) was $90,100.

Student life
The institution has a debate team that won the National Parliamentary Debate Association championship in 2007 and met success as Sweepstakes Champions three times since 2003. PLNU has won the Christian College National Championship seven times since 1998.

PLNU's resources include an honors program, career services, and study abroad opportunities. PLNU hosts numerous denominational and local community events: arts & culture gatherings, outdoor activities, and faith and ministry opportunities.

Athletics

The Point Loma Nazarene (PLNU) athletic teams are called the Sea Lions. The university is a member of the Division II level of the National Collegiate Athletic Association (NCAA), primarily competing in the Pacific West Conference (PacWest) since the 2012–13 academic year. They were also a member of the National Christian College Athletic Association (NCCAA), primarily competing as an independent in the West Region of the Division I level. The Sea Lions previously competed in the Golden State Athletic Conference (GSAC) of the National Association of Intercollegiate Athletics (NAIA) from 1986–87 to 2011–12.

Point Loma became an active member in the NCAA since the summer of 2014, which signified the conclusion of their three-year transition process from the NAIA to NCAA Division II.

Point Loma competes in 11 intercollegiate varsity sports: Men's sports include baseball, basketball, soccer and tennis; while women's sports include basketball, cross country, golf, soccer, tennis, track & field and volleyball.

Notable persons
Notable alumni include Edward J. Blakely, educator and researcher on urban and suburban issues, James Dobson, prominent evangelical psychologist, Greg Laswell, musician and producer, and Mildred Bangs Wynkoop, noted Nazarene theologian. The school has produced four college presidents. Two were presidents of the Eastern Nazarene College: Fred J. Shields and Floyd W. Nease, 1919-1923 and 1924–1930, respectively. One, Orval J. Nease, was president of his alma mater from 1928 to 1933. The fourth, David Alexander, has been president of Northwest Nazarene since 2008. Hoku, singer and daughter of the late Don Ho, studied business at PLNU briefly, but left during her first semester. William De Los Santos, author, poet, screenwriter and motion-picture director, attended (enrolled as William Hilbert). Micah Albert, photojournalist who has covered issues in Africa and the Middle East, earned a degree in graphic communications. Robert Pierce, the evangelist who founded World Vision and Samaritan's Purse, studied on the Pasadena campus. Destin Daniel Cretton, a filmmaker, majored in communications.

Notable faculty members include Frank G. Carver, Wesleyan Center Scholar in Residence; Darrel R. Falk, author of Coming to Peace with Science; and director of the Howard Hughes Medical Institute outreach program, Michael Lodahl. Another notable former faculty member is Olive Winchester.

References

External links
 
 Official athletics website

 
Liberal arts colleges in California
Point Loma, San Diego
Universities and colleges in San Diego
Educational institutions established in 1902
Schools accredited by the Western Association of Schools and Colleges
Evangelicalism in California
Council for Christian Colleges and Universities
1902 establishments in California
Private universities and colleges in California